S. Muthuramalingam was an Indian politician and former Member of the Legislative Assembly. He was elected to the Tamil Nadu legislative assembly as a Gandhi Kamaraj National Congress candidate from Radhapuram constituency in 1980 election.

References 

Tamil Nadu politicians
Living people
Year of birth missing (living people)